Shadowland: Search for Frances Farmer is a 1978 biographical novel by William Arnold, ostensibly about the life of actress Frances Farmer. The book is a fictionalized account which was further distorted when adapted as the film Frances in 1982. Arnold sued for copyright infringement, claiming the film's screenplay writers appropriated several of his "fictionalized" elements,  but eventually lost.

External links
 "Shedding Light on Shadowland" - In-depth essay detailing the many fictionalized elements in the film Frances and its source material.

1978 American novels
Biographical novels
Novels about actors
American novels adapted into films
McGraw-Hill books